Esengeldi (Esenkeldı), previously until 2001 Ladyzhenka, is a town in  the Akmola Region in Kazakhstan. It is located about 120 miles south-west of Astana, about 650 miles north-west of Almaty, and 660 miles south-west of Novosibirsk, Russia.

Populated places in Akmola Region